The following is a list of episodes of the Canadian-American science fiction television series  Beyond Reality which originally aired between October 4, 1991, and March 20, 1993. The series is about two university parapsychologists (Shari Belafonte and Carl Marotte) who investigate reports of paranormal phenomena that occur in ordinary people's lives.

Series overview

Episodes

Season 1 (1991–92)

Season 2 (1992–93)

External links 
 

Beyond Reality